Bryan Glacier may refer to:

Bryan Glacier, Palmer Land
Bryan Glacier, Victoria Land